Dolomena hickeyi is a species of sea snail, a marine gastropod mollusk in the family Strombidae, the true conchs.

Description
The shell grows to a length of 55 mm.

Distribution
This species is distributed along the Philippines and Queensland, Australia.

References

External links
 

Strombidae
Gastropods described in 2000